Darshan Raval is an Indian singer, composer, actor, and songwriter. He is known for his work in different languages including Hindi, Gujarati, and Telugu. In 2014, he participated in the StarPlus music reality show, India's Raw Star and achieved the position of the first runner-up.

Early life 
Prior to his entry into the entertainment industry, Raval faced academic challenges and was expelled from college due to poor academic performance.

Career

Raval's career began in 2014, when he participated in the reality show India's Raw Star and was declared the first runner-up. Raval has mentioned the support of Himesh Reshammiya as an important factor in his initial success in the Bollywood industry.

Although after that he doesn't stop to work hard. Darshan Raval second debut song Bekhudi is one of the game changing song of his career.

As of 2023, he has released several popular songs in different languages, including Hindi, Gujarati, and Telugu. Some of his notable works include "Ek Ladki Ko Dekha Toh Aisa Laga," "Chogada," and "Kheech Meri Photo".

Media 
Raval was ranked in  The Times Most Desirable Men at No. 45 in 2017. He won awards for Transmedia Gujarati Screen and Stage Award for Best Male Singer.

Discography

Film songs

Hindi

Gujarati

Telugu

Non-film songs

Hindi

Gujarati

Bengali

References

External links

 

Category :Participants in Indian reality television series
Category :Indian male singer-songwriters
Category :Indian singer-songwriters
Category :Singers from Ahmedabad
Category :Bollywood playback singers
Category :People from Maharashtra
Category :21st-century Indian singers
Category :Living people
Category :21st-century Indian male singers
Year of birth missing (living people)